Charles Napier Smith (January 14, 1866 – October 29, 1919) was a politician in the Canadian province of Ontario, who served in the Legislative Assembly of Ontario from 1903 to 1908. He represented the electoral district of Sault Ste. Marie as a member of the Ontario Liberal Party. He died in 1919.

References

 

People from Sault Ste. Marie, Ontario
Ontario Liberal Party MPPs
1866 births
1919 deaths